Rudolf Anderson Jr. (September 15, 1927 – October 27, 1962) was an American and United States Air Force major and pilot. He was the first recipient of the Air Force Cross, the U.S. military's and Air Force's second-highest award and decoration for valor. The only U.S fatality by enemy fire during the Cuban Missile Crisis, Anderson died when his U-2 reconnaissance aircraft was shot down over Cuba. He had previously served in Korea after the Korean War ended. He is seen as a war-hero in American society.

Early life and education
Anderson was born in Spartanburg, South Carolina  near Greenville. He earned the rank of Eagle Scout from Boy Scout Troop 19 in Greenville and was a member of Recovery Lodge no. 31, Greenville's oldest Masonic Lodge. After graduating from Augusta Circle Elementary School in Greenville, he graduated from Greenville High School in 1944. In 1948, he earned a Bachelor of Science degree in Textile Engineering from Clemson University in Clemson, South Carolina as a member of Air Force ROTC Detachment 770. For the next three years, he was employed in Greenville.

Air Force career
He entered the Air Force in November 1951 during the Korean War. Commissioned as a Second Lieutenant in 1952, Anderson completed Primary and Advanced pilot training and received his U.S. Air Force aeronautical rating as a pilot; he received his pilot wings in February 1953. He began his operational career flying RF-86 Sabres and earned two Distinguished Flying Crosses for reconnaissance missions after the war ended, when he was assigned to the 15th Tactical Reconnaissance Squadron at Kunsan Air Base in South Korea and flying missions out of Komaki Air Base in Japan. In April 1955, he returned to the United States. After qualifying on the U-2 on September 3, 1957, "he became the 4080th Strategic Reconnaissance Wing's top U-2 pilot with over one thousand hours, making him a vital part of the United States' reconnaissance operation over Cuba in late October of 1962."

Cuban Missile Crisis
Originally flown by the Central Intelligence Agency (CIA), the Lockheed U-2 high-altitude reconnaissance missions over Cuba were taken over by the Air Force on October 14, 1962, using CIA U-2 aircraft that were repainted with USAF insignia. Anderson was part of the 4028th Strategic Reconnaissance Weather Squadron, 4080th Strategic Reconnaissance Wing, headquartered at Laughlin Air Force Base, Texas. On October 15, when CIA analysts studied reconnaissance film from the first 4080th overflight, they found SS-4 medium-range ballistic missiles. These pictures triggered the Cuban Missile Crisis.

On Saturday, October 27, Anderson took off on his sixth mission over Cuba in a U-2F Dragon Lady (AF Serial Number 56-6676, former CIA Article 343), from a forward operating location at McCoy Air Force Base in Orlando, Florida. A few hours into his mission, he was shot down over Banes, Cuba by one of two Soviet-supplied S-75 Dvina (NATO designation SA-2 Guideline) surface-to-air missiles that were fired at his aircraft by the orders of two Soviet generals, stationed in Havana.

"The loss of the U-2 over Banes was probably caused by intercept by an SA-2 from the Banes site, or pilot hypoxia, with the former appearing more likely on the basis of present information" stated a CIA document dated 0200 hrs, October 28, 1962. This would mean Anderson was killed when fragmentation from the exploding proximity warhead punctured his pressure suit, causing it to decompress at high altitude.

On October 31, Acting United Nations Secretary-General U Thant returned from a visit with Premier Fidel Castro and announced that Anderson was dead. His body was released by Cuba on Sunday, November 4, and he was buried at Woodlawn Memorial Park in Greenville two days later.

By order of President John F. Kennedy, Anderson was posthumously awarded the first Air Force Cross, as well as the Air Force Distinguished Service Medal, the Purple Heart, and the Cheney Award. On July 26, 2011, Anderson was inducted into the Air Force Reserve Officer Training Corps Distinguished Alumni in a ceremony at Maxwell AFB, Alabama, officiated by Lieutenant General Allen G. Peck, Commander, Air University.

Anderson was the only combat death among the eleven U-2 pilots that flew over Cuba during the Cuban Missile Crisis; the other ten pilots were each awarded the Distinguished Flying Cross. Three reconnaissance-variant Boeing RB-47 Stratojets of the 55th Strategic Reconnaissance Wing crashed between September 27 and November 11, 1962, killing a total of 11 crewmembers. Seven more airmen died when a Boeing C-135B Stratolifter delivering ammunition to Naval Base Guantanamo Bay in Cuba stalled and crashed on approach on October 23.

Wreckage 

Some of the wreckage of Major Anderson's aircraft is on display in three museums in Cuba. One of the engine intakes is at the Museo de la Lucha contra Bandidos in Trinidad. The engine and portion of the tail assembly from the U-2F is at the Museum of the Revolution in Havana. The right wing, a portion of the tail assembly, and front landing gear are at the Fortaleza de San Carlos de la Cabaña, or La Cabaña, Havana. The two latter groups of parts were previously displayed at the Museo del Aire, Havana.

Military awards 
Anderson's military awards and decorations are as follows:

Air Force Cross citation

The President of the United States of America takes pride in presenting the Air Force Cross (Posthumously) to Rudolf Anderson, Major, United States Air Force, for extraordinary heroism in connection with military operations against an armed enemy while serving with the 4080th Strategic Reconnaissance Wing, Strategic Air Command (SAC), from 15 October 1962 to 27 October 1962. During this period of great national crisis, Major Anderson, flying an unescorted, unarmed aircraft, lost his life while participating in one of several aerial reconnaissance missions over Cuba. While executing these aerial missions, Major Anderson made photographs which provided the United States government with conclusive evidence of the introduction of long-range offensive missiles into Cuba and which materially assisted our leaders in charting the nation's military and diplomatic course. Through his extraordinary heroism, superb airmanship, and aggressiveness in the face of the enemy, Major Anderson reflected the highest credit upon himself and the United States Air Force.

Other awards, namings, memorials and recognitions 

Anderson's other recognitions:
 Cheney Award, 1962
 Anderson Elementary School at Eielson Air Force Base near Fairbanks, Alaska was named for him in 1964.
 The Maj. Rudolf Anderson Jr. Squadron of the Arnold Air Society at Clemson University was named in his honor.
 American Legion Post 214 in Greenville, South Carolina, was named after him in 2015.
 A memorial to Anderson was erected and dedicated to him in 1963 at Cleveland Park in Greenville. No surplus U-2 aircraft were available at the time, so an F-86 Sabre like the ones he flew in Korea was used instead: North American YF-86H-1-NA Sabre, AF Ser. No. 52-1976. The memorial was redesigned, and it was rededicated on October 27, 2012, the 50th anniversary of Anderson's death.
 The building for the 47th Operations Group at Laughlin AFB, Texas, was renamed "Anderson Hall" in 2001.
 Anderson was inducted in the South Carolina Aviation Hall of Fame in 2008.
 Anderson was inducted into the Greenville County Schools Hall of Fame in 2019.

Popular culture
The shooting down of Anderson's U-2 reconnaissance flight over Cuba is featured in the 2000 film Thirteen Days starring Kevin Costner; actor Charles Esten plays the role of Anderson.

References

 Central Intelligence Agency report – supplement 8 to Joint Evaluation of Soviet Missile Threat in Cuba, 0200 hours, October 28, 1962.

External links

 
 'The Twelfth Day' by Liz Newell from the Clemson University alumni magazine website
 Major Rudolf Anderson Jr. on ClemsonWiki by Mark Sublette from the Clemson Wiki website
 Anderson as a Mason in Greenville, SC

1927 births
1962 deaths
American military personnel killed in action
Aviators killed by being shot down
Clemson University alumni
Cuban Missile Crisis
Decompression accidents and incidents
Greenville Senior High School (Greenville, South Carolina) alumni
Military personnel from South Carolina
Military personnel killed in the Cold War
People from Greenville, South Carolina
Recipients of the Air Force Cross (United States)
Recipients of the Air Force Distinguished Service Medal
Recipients of the Distinguished Flying Cross (United States)
United States Air Force officers
Victims of aviation accidents or incidents in 1962
Western spies against the Eastern Bloc
United States Air Force personnel of the Korean War
American Korean War pilots
People from Spartanburg, South Carolina
Aviators from South Carolina